Mark Matlock (born 1969) was the former executive director of youth specialties and the founder of WisdomWorks Ministries. He is an ordained minister and youth pastor who lives in Dallas. He coauthored the book Dirty Faith with Audio Adrenaline. He also wrote Freshman: The College Student's Guide to Developing Wisdom. In this book, Matlock gives the following definition for wisdom: "the human capacity to understand life from God's perspective"; in the book Lost in Transition: Becoming Spiritually Prepared for College, Tommy McGregor praised Matlock's definition for recognizing that "true wisdom comes from God." Matlock spoke at the 2006 Creation Festival, the world's biggest Christian music festival. He also spoke to an audience of 11,000 Christian youth at DCLA that year. In 2011, he spoke at the Nazarene Youth Conference in Louisville, Kentucky. Mark is the main speaker and founder of Planet Wisdom, which has featured Chris Coleman, Mercy Me, The Digital Age, Addison Road The Swift, The Skit Guys (Eddie James & Tommy Woodard), Fred Lynch, Sean McDowell and Heather Flies.

References

1969 births
Living people
People from Dallas
American Christian clergy
21st-century Christian clergy
American Christian writers
Christian scholars
Writers from Texas
American motivational writers
American spiritual writers
American religion academics
21st-century scholars
Sociologists of religion
American sociologists
21st-century American poets
21st-century American non-fiction writers
21st-century American clergy